Lesbian, gay, bisexual and transgender (LGBT) people in Tunisia face legal challenges not experienced by non-LGBT residents. Both male and female same-sex sexual activity are illegal. According to the United States Department of State's 2018 report on human rights in Tunisia, "authorities occasionally use [the anti-sodomy law] to detain and question persons about their sexual activities and orientation, reportedly at times based on appearance alone."

LGBT Tunisians face both legal and social discrimination. Reports of family rejection, violence in public spaces, violence within families and suicides are quite common.

History

Early history 
From the end of the 18th century to the start of the 19th century, gay men held social roles in Tunisia similar to those in other parts of the Muslim world despite ongoing stigmatisation. They served as intermediaries between masculine and feminine spaces during wedding celebrations, were invited in men's houses in the presence of their wives, and could enter in private spaces reserved for women in a similar status to the blind.

Rule of Zine El Abidine Ben Ali 
In 2008, the Government of Tunisia was one of the co-sponsors of an opposing statement to the 2008 United Nations General Assembly resolution and declaration calling for the decriminalization of same-sex sexual intercourse worldwide.

During the rule of Zine El Abidine Ben Ali from 1987 to 2011, the regime filtered gay and lesbian information and dating pages.

Post-Arab Spring period 
After the Tunisian Revolution and the 2011 Tunisian Constituent Assembly election, the then-Minister for Human Rights and Transitional Justice, Samir Dilou, remarked on national television that homosexuality was not a human rights issue, but a condition in need of medical treatment. Amnesty International condemned this statement. In June 2012, the Government rejected the United Nations Human Rights Council's recommendation to decriminalize same-sex intercourse, arguing it was a Western concept at odds with Islam, Tunisian culture, and traditions. Critics have argued the anti-gay legislation was passed under French Tunisia, though France itself had no such laws at the time.

Legality of same-sex sexual activity 
Article 230 of the Penal Code of 1913 (largely modified in 1964) decrees imprisonment of up to three years for private acts of sodomy between consenting adults.

Cross-dressing is not expressly illegal, although transgender people, along with gay people, are often accused of violating Article 226 of the national Penal Code which outlaws "outrages against public decency".

On 7 December 2016, two Tunisian men were arrested on suspicion of homosexual activity in Sousse, "anally probed" and forced to sign confessions of having committed "sodomy". On 11 March 2017, while on bail, they were given eight-month prison sentences.

Local LGBT association Association Shams has reported that since the Tunisian revolution in 2011, an increasing number of gay men have been being jailed: 127 in 2018, in contrast to 79 in 2017, and 56 in 2016. As of April 2019, at least 22 arrests had been made so far in 2019.

On 6 July 2020, Human Rights Watch said that a Tunisian court sentenced two men for homosexuality. Police arrested the two men on the suspicion of same-sex conduct on 3 June and attempted to subject the defendants to an anal exam, apparently to use as evidence in the case.

If the individual, accused of homosexuality, refused to be "anally probed", the authorities would view this refusal as evidence of guilt. In June 2017, a 16-year-old teen was sentenced to four months in jail for homosexuality after refusing to be "anally probed".

In September 2017, Minister Mehdi Ben Gharbia agreed to stop forced anal tests as proof of homosexuality. Ben Gharbia told Agence France-Presse that authorities could still perform anal tests on men suspected of being gay, but "these exams can no longer be imposed by force, physical or moral, or without the consent of the person concerned". Additionally, he said that Tunisia was "committed to protecting the sexual minority from any form of stigmatization, discrimination and violence", adding that "civil society must first be prepared" for such change in a Muslim country. However as of 2019, reports by local human rights and LGBT associations confirm that anal tests are still being ordered by courts to determine whether a suspect is gay or not throughout 2018 and 2019.

Decriminalization efforts 
Association Shams has long advocated for the repeal of article 230. Several civil organizations, such as the Tunisian Association of Democratic Women, have also been pushing for its repeal.

In June 2012, Human Rights Minister Samir Dilou rejected the recommendation of the United Nations Human Rights Committee for Tunisia to decriminalize same-sex sexual acts, stating that the concept of "sexual orientation is specific to the West" and is overridden by Tunisian law, which "clearly describes Tunisia as an Arab Muslim country". In response, Amanullah De Sondy, Assistant Professor of Islamic Studies at the University of Miami said, "It appears that the minister is stating that Article 230 is about upholding Islam yet it is a French Colonial law that was imposed on Tunisia in 1913 and has nothing to do with Islam or Tunisian Arab traditions."

In 2014, a campaign was launched on Facebook to repeal the criminal laws used against LGBT people in Tunisia. A representative of this campaign expressed an interest to create a registered group in Tunisia to campaign for these legal reforms. Several NGOs in Tunisia, including the Tunisian Association of Democratic Women, asked the Government to repeal the criminal law against homosexuality.

In October 2015, Justice Minister Mohammed Saleh bin Aissa called for the abolition of Chapter 230 of the Penal Code, but was quickly rebuked by the President of Tunisia, Beji Caid Essebsi, who said, "This will not happen."

The international non-governmental organisation Human Rights Watch published a report in March 2016 urging the Tunisian Government to decriminalise consensual same-sex conduct and noting that the ongoing discrimination against gay men and men perceived to be homosexual were subject to grave human rights abuses "including beatings, forced anal examinations, and routine humiliating treatment." Much of the report was informed by the treatment of the "Kairouan Six", six students in Kairouan who were detained and punished under Article 230.

On 15 June 2018, the Individual Freedoms and Equality Committee (COLIBE), a presidential committee composed of legislators, professors and human rights advocates, recommended to President Beji Caid Essebsi the decriminalization of homosexuality in Tunisia. MP Bochra Belhaj Hmida told NBC News that the committee's recommendation regarding homosexuality "is the outright repeal of article 230." The committee did propose a second option, which is lowering the punishment to a fine of 500 dinars (around $200) and no risk of jail time. The committee wrote in its report: "The state and society have nothing to do with the sexual life amongst adults' … sexual orientations and choices of individuals are essential to private life."

The commission's proposal faces strong opposition from social conservatives, who claim it would "eradicate Tunisian identity" and have likened it to "intellectural [sic] terrorism".

Recognition of same-sex relationships 

The personal status code doesn't explicitly define marriage to be between a man and a woman, but it's implied according to its different article. Only that type of marriage is regulated. There is no law that regulates same-sex marriages or a civil unions.
In 2020, Tunisian authorities approved the family reunification of a same-sex couple married abroad, a move initially reported as indirect recognition of the marriage, but the government repeated that it does not recognize same-sex marriages and the approval may have been an administrative oversight.

Gender identity and expression 
There is no legal recognition for transgender or gender non-conforming people. On 22 December 1993, the Court of Appeals in Tunis rejected a request from a trans woman to change her legal gender (statut civil) from male to female. The judgement from the Court declared that her gender change is a "voluntary and artificial operation" that does not justify a change in legal status.
However, in 2018, a trans man succeeded in changing his legal status in a revolutionary judgement.

LGBT civil society and culture 
In 2015, Association Shams was formed as Tunisia's first LGBT rights organization. On 18 May 2015, Shams received official government recognition as an organization. On 10 December 2015, which is International Human Rights Day, Shams group joined with local activist groups to protest the ongoing discrimination against Tunisia's LGBT community.

A Facebook page campaigning for LGBT rights in Tunisia also has several thousand "likes". There are at least seven organised LGBT rights groups in Tunisia: Association Shams, Mawjoudin, Damj, Chouf, Kelmty, Alwani, and Queer of the Bled.

In May 2016, several LGBTI associations organized a small, discreet gay pride reception in Tunis. Associations also organized events and public demonstrations to mark the International Day against Homophobia in May.

An online radio station catering to the LGBT community began broadcasting in December 2017, believed to be the first of its kind in the Arabic-speaking world.

Media 
In March 2011, Tunisia's first online magazine for the country's LGBT community, Gayday Magazine, was launched. Running stories and interviews related to the country's community, the publications covers consisted on English and French titles. In 2012, Gayday was hacked, as homophobic hackers took over the publication's email, Twitter and Facebook accounts. These attacks took place at the height of an international campaign of which Gayday Magazine is a part, to raise awareness about the massacre of emo and gay people in Iraq.

Fadi Krouj is the editor-in-chief and creator of Gayday Magazine. Commenting on the International Day Against Homophobia, Transphobia and Biphobia in 2012, Fadi said: "The Tunisian LGBT community in Tunisia has started to mobilize and discreetly form its support-base. Reactions to the thus far mainly online activism were met with radical, homophobic statements from the current Minister of Human Rights, Samir Dilou. He described homosexuality as a mental illness that requires treatment and isolation, and described social values and traditions as red lines not to be crossed."

Film culture 
A number of Tunisian films have address same-sex attraction: Man of Ashes (1986), Bedwin Hacker (2003), Fleur d'oubli (2005), The String (2010), and Histoires tunisiennes (2011).

In January 2018, the Mawjoudin Queer Film Festival successfully took place. It was organized by the Mawjoudin association, and was the first ever film festival celebrating the LGBT community in Tunisia and all of North Africa. The second edition of the festival was held on 22–25 March 2019 in downtown Tunis.

Male prostitution 
Male prostitution occurs in Tunisian tourist resorts. In 2013, Ronny De Smet, a Belgian tourist, was sentenced to three years in prison for attempted homosexual seduction in what he believes was a sting operation by local police to extort money. De Smet was released three months later.

Politics
In 2019, ahead of the 2019 presidential election, lawyer and LGBT activist Mounir Baatour announced his candidacy for president, making him the first gay man to run for president in Tunisia and the Arab World.

Public opinion 

Public opinion regarding LGBT right is complex. According to a 2014 poll by the ILGA, 18% of Tunisian people were in favor of legalizing same-sex marriage, with 61% opposed.

During a television interview in February 2012, Minister for Human Rights Samir Dilou stated that "freedom of speech has its limits", homosexuality is "a perversion", and gay people needed to be "treated medically". His comments were condemned by some in Tunisian society who posted pro-LGBT pictures on social networking sites.

An opinion poll conducted by Elka Consulting in 2016 showed that 64.5% of Tunisians believed that "homosexuals should be punished", while 10.9% said "homosexuals should not be punished".

Summary table

See also

 Human rights in Tunisia
 LGBT rights in Africa
 Politics of Tunisia

Notes

References

External links 
Shams - Pour la dépénalisation de l'homosexualité en Tunisie. Facebook
 Cordall, Simon Speakman. "Tunisia's lesbian community mobilises against deep-rooted prejudice" (Archive). The Guardian. 2 September 2015.

LGBT in Tunisia
Law of Tunisia
Human rights in Tunisia
Politics of Tunisia
Tunisia